Deathrow Gameshow is a 1987 black comedy film, directed by Mark Pirro, in which condemned prisoners are given opportunities to be granted reprieves for their sentences by participating in a television game show. Starring John McCafferty and Beano, it has gained a cult following since its initial release and received a blu-ray release by Vinegar Syndrome in 2018.

References

External links
 

1987 films
American prison films
American satirical films
Films about television
1980s black comedy films
1987 thriller films
Films about quizzes and game shows
Crown International Pictures films
1987 comedy films
1980s American films